Ingushes in Syria — is an Ingush diaspora of around thirty-five thousand people who live in many cities and villages of modern Syria.

History

During the Caucasian War 
After the Caucasian War in 1865, part of the Ingush migrated (Muhajirism) to the Ottoman Empire. In total, 1454 families moved out of Ingushetia, in particular from two communities (Karabulak and Nazranovsky sections of the Ingush district) (including Karabulaks - 1366 families and Nazranians - 88 families) (according to other sources - up to 1500 families of Karabulaks and 100 families Nazranites). The descendants of those settlers form the Ingush diasporas in Turkey, Jordan and Syria. In these countries, many Ingush were recorded under the ethnonym Circassians.

Modern time 
It is known that the Ingush are fighting on the territory of Syria, on the side of the rebels, it is also known that battle-hardened Arabs make films related to the activities of Ingush groups. Judging by the video recordings, some of the Ingush lead some of the detachments of the assault troops.

See also 

Ingush diaspora
Ingushes in Europe
Ingushes in Turkey
Ingushes in Jordan

References

Bibliography 

 
 
 
 

Syria
Ethnic groups in Syria